Ghelna is a genus of North American jumping spiders that was first described by Wayne Paul Maddison in 1996.

Species
 it contains four species, found only in Canada and the United States:
Ghelna barrowsi (Kaston, 1973) – USA
Ghelna canadensis (Banks, 1897) – USA, Canada
Ghelna castanea (Hentz, 1846) (type) – USA
Ghelna sexmaculata (Banks, 1895) – USA, Canada

References

External links
 Picture of G. canadensis 
 Picture of G. castanea 
 Pictures of G. sexmaculata 

Salticidae genera
Salticidae
Spiders of North America